The family Pandaceae consists of three genera that were formerly recognized in the Euphorbiaceae. Those are:
Galearia (from tribe Galearieae, subfamily Acalyphoideae, family Euphorbiaceae)
Microdesmis (from tribe Galearieae, subfamily Acalyphoideae, family Euphorbiaceae)
Panda (from tribe Galearieae, subfamily Acalyphoideae, family Euphorbiaceae)

These genera contain 17 species, which especially live in West Africa or Southeast Asia.

Species in this family are dioecious trees or shrubs, with alternate, simple leaves.

The genus Centroplacus was formerly included in the Pandaceae and had also been recognized in the tribe Centroplaceae, family Phyllanthaceae). The APG III system recognized this genus as a part of the family Centroplacaceae.

References

 
Malpighiales families
Dioecious plants